The Japca Monastery is a monastery in Florești District, Moldova.

It is the only monastery from Basarabia which was never closed by the Soviet authorities.

References

External links 
 Mănăstirea Japca (Şabca) 

Religious buildings and structures in Moldova
Churches in Moldova
Christian monasteries in Moldova
Christian monasteries established in the 18th century